Saint-Célestin is a village municipality in the Centre-du-Québec region of the province of Quebec in Canada.

It is enclaved within the municipality that is also called Saint-Célestin.

Demographics 

Population trend:

Notable residents 
 Louis Bourgeois (1856–1930), architect and designer of the Bahá'í House of Worship in Wilmette, Illinois, was born in Saint-Célestin-de-Nicolet, Quebec on March 19, 1856.

See also
List of village municipalities in Quebec

References 

Villages in Quebec
Incorporated places in Centre-du-Québec
Nicolet-Yamaska Regional County Municipality